Eburodacrys prolixa is a species of beetle in the family Cerambycidae. It was described by Monné and Martins in 1992.

References

Eburodacrys
Beetles described in 1992